Aldfreck is a townland in County Antrim, Northern Ireland.

The Battle of Aldfreck was fought in November 1597.

Popular culture
David Hume wrote a poem about the "Aldfreck Mining Disaster".

See also 
List of townlands in County Antrim
List of places in County Antrim

References

Townlands of County Antrim